Clay Township is one of nine townships in Hamilton County, Indiana, United States. As of the 2010 census, its population was 83,293 and it contained 32,375 housing units. With the annexation of Home Place, Indiana, Carmel, became completely coterminous with the township.

History
Clay Township was organized in 1833.

Micah Newby House was listed on the National Register of Historic Places in 1986.

Geography
The streams of Almond Ditch, Ams Run, Blue Woods Creek, Boone Creek, Center Creek, Clay Creek, Cool Creek, Elliot Creek, Lily Vestal Drain, Henley Creek, Highway Run, Hot Lick Creek, Kirkendall Creek, Lion Creek, Little Cool Creek, Long Branch, Mitchener Ditch, Spring Mill Run, Well Run, Will Creek, and Witt Creek run through this township.

Cities and towns
 Carmel

Adjacent townships
 Washington Township (north)
 Noblesville Township (northeast)
 Delaware Township (east)
 Washington Township, Marion County (south)
 Pike Township, Marion County (southwest)
 Eagle Township, Boone County (west)
 Union Township, Boone County (northwest)

Cemeteries
The township contains six cemeteries: Calvary, Carmel, Farley, Pleasant Grove, Poplar Ridge, and White Chapel.

Major highways
 Interstate 465
 U.S. Route 31
 U.S. Route 421
 State Road 234
 State Road 431

References
 
 United States Census Bureau cartographic boundary files

External links
 Indiana Township Association
 United Township Association of Indiana

Townships in Hamilton County, Indiana
Townships in Indiana